Dothistroma is a genus of fungi belonging to the family Mycosphaerellaceae.

The genus has almost cosmopolitan distribution.

Species:

Dothistroma flichianum 
Dothistroma pini 
Dothistroma septosporum

References

Mycosphaerellaceae
Mycosphaerellaceae genera